Gasongo is a village in the Tikare Department of Bam Province in northern Burkina Faso. It has a population of 811.

References

External links
Satellite map at Maplandia.com

Populated places in the Centre-Nord Region
Bam Province